Jerald Stillwell "Jerry" Thompson (August 15, 1923 – August 26, 2021) was an American long-distance runner who competed in the 1948 Summer Olympics.  Earlier in the year, he was NCAA Champion, though he was runner up to Curt Stone at the Olympic Trials. He was inducted into the Texas Track and Field Coaches Hall of Fame, Class of 2016. Thompson died in August 2021 at the age of 98.

References

1923 births
2021 deaths
American male long-distance runners
Athletes (track and field) at the 1948 Summer Olympics
Olympic track and field athletes of the United States
20th-century American people